Born and Raised is the first extended play by American hip hop duo Smif-N-Wessun. It was released on December 3, 2013 through Duck Down Music. Entirely produced by Beatnick & K-Salaam, the six-song EP is a blend between reggae and hip hop music, and includes guest appearances from Jahdan Blakkamoore, Junior Kelly and Junior Reid. The EP was preceded by one single — "Solid Ground" featuring dancehall icon Junior Reid.

Critical reception

Homer Johnsen of HipHopDX gave the album a three out of five, saying "Fans of Smif-N-Wessun will likely be pleased with Born and Raised. It is a notable change from their last effort, Monumental with Pete Rock, which speaks to their versatility as artists. The reggae flavor is also reminiscent of their raggamuffin-rap days as Cocoa Brovaz. In all, Born and Raised is an amalgamation of reggae and hip hop that displays Tek and Steele's ability to think inside and outside the box simultaneously".

Track listing

Notes
Track 4 features singling vocals by Velvet A. Ross and chatting vocals by DJ Full Front

Personnel
Tekomin "Tek" Williams – main artist, executive producer
Darrell "Steele" Yates, Jr. – main artist, executive producer
Keith "Junior Kelly" Morgan – featured artist (track 1)
Wayne "Jahdan Blakkamoore" Henry – featured artist (tracks: 2, 5, 6)
Delroy "Junior" Reid – featured artist (track 3)
Velvet A. Ross – additional vocals (track 4)
DJ Full Front – additional vocals (track 4)
Kayvon "K-Salaam" Sarfehjooy – engineering, mixing, mastering, producer, executive producer
Nick "Beatnick" Phillips – engineering, mixing, mastering, producer, executive producer
Kenyatta "Buckshot" Blake – executive producer
Drew "Dru-Ha" Friedman – executive producer
Noah "NoHa" Friedman – project coordinator

References

2013 EPs
Reggae EPs
Smif-n-Wessun albums
Duck Down Music albums
Reggae albums by American artists